The 2014–15 UEFA Youth League was the second season of the UEFA Youth League, a European youth club football competition organised by UEFA. It was contested by the under-19 youth teams of the 32 clubs qualified for the group stage of the 2014–15 UEFA Champions League.

The final was played on 13 April 2015 at the Colovray Stadium in Nyon, Switzerland, between Shakhtar Donetsk and Chelsea. Chelsea won 3–2 and secured their first title in the competition. Barcelona were the title holders, but were eliminated by Anderlecht in the round of 16.

Players must be born on or after 1 January 1996.

Teams
The youth teams of the 32 clubs which participated in the 2014–15 UEFA Champions League group stage entered the competition.

Round and draw dates
The schedule of the competition was as follows.

Note: Round of 16 and quarter-final matches may be played outside of the scheduled dates.

On 23 September 2014, UEFA announced a change to the schedule of the semi-finals and finals, which were originally due to take place on 24 and 27 April respectively.

Group stage

The 32 teams were drawn into eight groups of four, with the group compositions being the same as in the draw for the 2014–15 UEFA Champions League group stage, which was held on 28 August 2014, 17:45 CEST, at the Grimaldi Forum in Monaco.

In each group, teams played against each other home-and-away in a round-robin format. The matchdays were 16–18 September, 30 September–2 October, 21–23 October, 4–6 November, 25–27 November, and 9–11 December 2014, with the matches played on the same matchday as the corresponding Champions League matches, but not necessarily on the same day. The group winners and runners-up advanced to the round of 16.

Tiebreakers
The teams were ranked according to points (3 points for a win, 1 point for a tie, 0 points for a loss). If two or more teams were equal on points on completion of the group matches, the following criteria were applied to determine the rankings:
higher number of points obtained in the group matches played among the teams in question;
superior goal difference from the group matches played among the teams in question;
higher number of goals scored in the group matches played among the teams in question;
higher number of goals scored away from home in the group matches played among the teams in question;
If, after applying criteria 1 to 4 to several teams, two teams still had an equal ranking, criteria 1 to 4 were reapplied exclusively to the matches between the two teams in question to determine their final rankings. If this procedure did not lead to a decision, criteria 6 to 9 applied;
superior goal difference from all group matches played;
higher number of goals scored from all group matches played;
lower disciplinary points total based only on yellow and red cards received during the group stage (red card = 3 points, yellow card = 1 point, expulsion for two yellow cards in one match = 3 points);
drawing of lots.

Times up to 25 October 2014 (matchdays 1–3) were CEST (UTC+2), thereafter (matchdays 4–6) times were CET (UTC+1).

Group A

Group B

Group C

Group D

The match was abandoned at the 90+5th minute, with Anderlecht leading 2–0, due to Turkish fans setting off fireworks and throwing objects. UEFA ruled the match as a forfeit by Galatasaray and awarded Anderlecht a 3–0 win.

Group E

Group F

Group G

Group H

Knockout phase
In the knockout phase, teams played against each other over one match. If scores were level after full-time, the match was decided by penalty shoot-out (no extra time was played). The mechanism of the draws for each round was as follows:
In the draw for the round of 16, the eight group winners were seeded, and the eight group runners-up were unseeded. The seeded teams were drawn against the unseeded teams, with the seeded teams hosting the match. Teams from the same group or the same association could not be drawn against each other.
In the draws for the quarter-finals onwards, there were no seedings, and teams from the same group or the same association could be drawn against each other. The draw also decided the home team for each quarter-final, and the "home" team for administrative purposes for each semi-final and final (which were played on neutral ground).

Bracket
The draw for the knockout phase was held on 15 December 2014, 14:00 CET, at UEFA headquarters in Nyon, Switzerland.

On 17 July 2014, the UEFA emergency panel ruled that Ukrainian and Russian clubs would not be drawn against each other "until further notice" due to the political unrest between the countries. Therefore, Ukrainian club Shakhtar Donetsk and Russian club Zenit Saint Petersburg could not be drawn against each other in the round of 16. The winners of the ties involving these two clubs could also not be drawn against each other in the quarter-finals.

Times up to 28 March 2015 (round of 16 and quarter-finals) were CET (UTC+1), thereafter (semi-finals and final) times were CEST (UTC+2).

Round of 16
The round of 16 matches were played on 27 January, 17, 23, 24 and 25 February 2015.

Quarter-finals
The quarter-finals were played on 10, 17 and 18 March 2015.

Semi-finals
The semi-finals were played on 10 April 2015 at the Colovray Stadium in Nyon, Switzerland.

Final
The final was played on 13 April 2015 at the Colovray Stadium in Nyon, Switzerland.

Statistics

Top goalscorers

Top assists

References

External links
2014–15 UEFA Youth League
Final tournament: Nyon 2015
Final tournament official programme

Youth
2014–15
Uefa Youth League
Uefa Youth League